La Plata Rugby Club is an Argentine rugby union club from the city of La Plata in Buenos Aires Province. The club currently plays in Primera A, the first division of the URBA league system.

The club has also a women's rugby team competing in "Torneo Femenino", organized by the same body.

History
In 1924, members of the rowing section of multi-sports Club Gimnasia y Esgrima La Plata decided to try a new sport, so they could stay fit during the winter period. After a visit from players of CASI, rugby was chosen.

The rugby section of CGE La Plata officially opened and registered with the Unión de Rugby de Buenos Aires in 1925. Eight years later, football became professional in Argentina and URBA decided that rugby teams could not be part of professional clubs as rugby is an amateur sport in Argentina.

In 1934, the rugby section of Club Gimnasia y Esgrima La Plata unmerged to become an independent club. Five years later the club would change its name to "La Plata Rugby Club" and severe all remaining ties with Gimnasia y Esgrima.

La Plata Rugby Club is the leading rugby club in La Plata with more than 1,000 players and 4,500 members. Many players have gone on to play for the national team and professional clubs in Europe.

Nowadays the club plays at the highest level of URBA's league system, fielding teams at all levels.

Titles
Nacional de Clubes (1): 2007
Torneo de la URBA (1): 1995

References

External links
 

L
L
L
1934 establishments in Argentina